The Liénard–Wiechert potentials describe the classical electromagnetic effect of a moving electric point charge in terms of a vector potential and a scalar potential in the Lorenz gauge. Stemming directly from Maxwell's equations, these describe the complete, relativistically correct, time-varying electromagnetic field for a point charge in arbitrary motion, but are not corrected for quantum mechanical effects. Electromagnetic radiation in the form of waves can be obtained from these potentials. These expressions were developed in part by Alfred-Marie Liénard in 1898 and independently by Emil Wiechert in 1900.

Equations

Definition of Liénard–Wiechert potentials

The retarded time is defined, in the context of distributions of charges and currents, as 
 
is no more fixed, but becomes a function of the retarded time itself. In other words, following the trajectory
of  yields the implicit equation 

which provides the retarded time  as a function of the current time (and of the given trajectory): 
.

and

where:

  is the velocity of the source expressed as a fraction of the speed of light;

  is the distance from the source;

  is the unit vector pointing in the direction from the source and,

 The symbol  means that the quantities inside the parenthesis should be evaluated at the retarded time .

Field computation
We can calculate the electric and magnetic fields directly from the potentials using the definitions:
 and 

The calculation is nontrivial and requires a number of steps. The electric and magnetic fields are (in non-covariant form):

and

Note that the  part of the first term updates the direction of the field toward the instantaneous position of the charge, if it continues to move with constant velocity . This term is connected with the "static" part of the electromagnetic field of the charge.

The second term, which is connected with electromagnetic radiation by the moving charge, requires charge acceleration  and if this is zero, the value of this term is zero, and the charge does not radiate (emit electromagnetic radiation). This term requires additionally that a component of the charge acceleration be in a direction transverse to the line which connects the charge  and the observer of the field . The direction of the field associated with this radiative term is toward the fully time-retarded position of the charge (i.e. where the charge was when it was accelerated).

Derivation

The  scalar and  vector potentials satisfy the nonhomogeneous electromagnetic wave equation where the sources are expressed with the charge and current densities  and  

and the Ampère-Maxwell law is:

Since the potentials are not unique, but have gauge freedom, these equations can be simplified by gauge fixing. A common choice is the Lorenz gauge condition:

Then the nonhomogeneous wave equations become uncoupled and symmetric in the potentials:

Generally, the retarded solutions for the scalar and vector potentials (SI units) are

and

satisfy the homogeneous wave equation with no sources and the boundary conditions. In the case that there are no boundaries surrounding the sources then

Substituting into the expressions for the potential gives

We exchange the order of integration:

The delta function picks out  which allows us to perform the inner integration with ease.

To evaluate this integral, therefore, we need the identity

Because there is only one retarded time  for any given space-time coordinates  and source trajectory , this reduces to:

Notice that the retarded time  is the solution of the equation . Finally, the delta function picks out , and

which are the Liénard–Wiechert potentials.

Lorenz gauge, electric and magnetic fields

Taking the derivatives of both sides of its defining equation (remembering that ):

Differentiating with respect to t,

It follows that

These can be used in calculating the derivatives of the vector potential and the resulting expressions are

These show that the Lorenz gauge is satisfied, namely that .

Similarly one calculates:

The expression for the electric field mentioned above becomes

which is easily seen to be equal to 

Similarly  gives the expression of the magnetic field mentioned above:

Implications

The study of classical electrodynamics was instrumental in Albert Einstein's development of the theory of relativity.  Analysis of the motion and propagation of electromagnetic waves led to the special relativity description of space and time.  The Liénard–Wiechert formulation is an important launchpad into a deeper analysis of relativistic moving particles.

The Liénard–Wiechert description is accurate for a large, independently moving particle (i.e. the treatment is "classical" and the acceleration of the charge is due to a force independent of the electromagnetic field). The Liénard–Wiechert formulation always provides  two sets of solutions: Advanced fields are absorbed by the charges and retarded fields are emitted. Schwarzschild and Fokker considered the advanced field of a system of moving charges, and the retarded field of a system of charges having the same geometry and opposite charges. Linearity of Maxwell's equations in vacuum allows one to add both systems, so that the charges disappear: This trick allows Maxwell's equations to become linear in matter.
Multiplying electric parameters of both problems by arbitrary real constants produces a coherent interaction of light with matter which generalizes Einstein's theory which is now considered as founding theory of lasers: it is not necessary to study a large set of identical molecules to get coherent amplification in the mode obtained by arbitrary multiplications of advanced and retarded fields.
To compute energy, it is necessary to use the absolute fields which includes the zero point field; otherwise, an error appears, for instance in photon counting.

It is important to take into account the zero point field discovered by Planck. It replaces Einstein's "A" coefficient and explains that the classical electron is stable on Rydberg's classical orbits. Moreover, introducing the fluctuations of the zero point field produces Willis E. Lamb's correction of levels of H atom.

Quantum electrodynamics helped bring together the radiative behavior with the quantum constraints. It introduces quantization of normal modes of the electromagnetic field in assumed perfect optical resonators.

Universal speed limit

The force on a particle at a given location  and time  depends in a complicated way on the position of the source particles at an earlier time  due to the finite speed, c, at which electromagnetic information travels. A particle on Earth 'sees' a charged particle accelerate on the Moon as this acceleration happened 1.5 seconds ago, and a charged particle's acceleration on the Sun as happened 500 seconds ago. This earlier time in which an event happens such that a particle at location  'sees' this event at a later time  is called the retarded time, .  The retarded time varies with position; for example the retarded time at the Moon is 1.5 seconds before the current time and the retarded time on the Sun is 500 s before the current time on the Earth.  The retarded time tr=tr(r,t) is defined implicitly by

where  is the distance of the particle from the source at the retarded time. Only electromagnetic wave effects depend fully on the retarded time.

A novel feature in the Liénard–Wiechert potential is seen in the breakup of its terms into two types of field terms (see below), only one of which depends fully on the retarded time. The first of these is the static electric (or magnetic) field term that depends only on the distance to the moving charge, and does not depend on the retarded time at all, if the velocity of the source is constant. The other term is dynamic, in that it requires that the moving charge be accelerating with a component perpendicular to the line connecting the charge and the observer and does not appear unless the source changes velocity. This second term is connected with electromagnetic radiation.

The first term describes near field effects from the charge, and its direction in space is updated with a term that corrects for any constant-velocity motion of the charge on its distant static field, so that the distant static field appears at distance from the charge, with no aberration of light or light-time correction. This term, which corrects for time-retardation delays in the direction of the static field, is required by Lorentz invariance. A charge moving with a constant velocity must appear to a distant observer in exactly the same way as a static charge appears to a moving observer, and in the latter case, the direction of the static field must change instantaneously, with no time-delay. Thus, static fields (the first term) point exactly at the true instantaneous (non-retarded) position of the charged object if its velocity has not changed over the retarded time delay. This is true over any distance separating objects.

The second term, however, which contains information about the acceleration and other unique behavior of the charge that cannot be removed by changing the Lorentz frame (inertial reference frame of the observer), is fully dependent for direction on the time-retarded position of the source. Thus, electromagnetic radiation (described by the second term) always appears to come from the direction of the position of the emitting charge at the retarded time. Only this second term describes information transfer about the behavior of the charge, which transfer occurs (radiates from the charge) at the speed of light. At "far" distances (longer than several wavelengths of radiation), the 1/R dependence of this term makes electromagnetic field effects (the value of this field term) more powerful than "static" field effects, which are described by the 1/R2 field of the first (static) term and thus decay more rapidly with distance from the charge.

Existence and uniqueness of the retarded time

Existence
The retarded time is not guaranteed to exist in general. For example, if, in a given frame of reference, an electron has just been created, then at this very moment another electron does not yet feel its electromagnetic force at all. However, under certain conditions, there always exists a retarded time. For example, if the source charge has existed for an unlimited amount of time, during which it has always travelled at a speed not exceeding , then there exists a valid retarded time . This can be seen by considering the function . At the present time ; . The derivative  is given by

By the mean value theorem, . By making  sufficiently large, this can become negative, i.e., at some point in the past, . Intuitively, as the source charge moves back in time, the cross section of its light cone at present time expands faster than it can recede, so eventually it must reach the point . In this case the cross section of the light cone at present time approaches the point  as the observer travels back in time but does not necessarily ever reach it.

Uniqueness
For a given point  and trajectory of the point source , there is at most one value of the retarded time , i.e., one value  such that . Subtracting gives  by the triangle inequality. The intuitive interpretation is that one can only ever "see" the point source at one location/time at once unless it travels at least at the speed of light to another location. As the source moves forward in time, the cross section of its light cone at present time contracts faster than the source can approach, so it can never intersect the point  again.

The conclusion is that, under certain conditions, the retarded time exists and is unique.

See also
Maxwell's equations which govern classical electromagnetism
Classical electromagnetism for the larger theory surrounding this analysis
Relativistic electromagnetism
Special relativity, which was a direct consequence of these analyses
Rydberg formula for quantum description of the EM radiation due to atomic orbital electrons
Jefimenko's equations
Larmor formula
Abraham–Lorentz force
Inhomogeneous electromagnetic wave equation
Wheeler–Feynman absorber theory also known as the Wheeler–Feynman time-symmetric theory
Paradox of a charge in a gravitational field
Whitehead's theory of gravitation

References

External links
The Feynman Lectures on Physics Vol. II Ch. 21: Solutions of Maxwell’s Equations with Currents and Charges

Electromagnetic radiation
Potentials